Théméricourt is a commune in the Val-d'Oise department in Île-de-France in northern France.

4 movie scenes in 4 films
Théméricourt place Saint–Lô

See also
Communes of the Val-d'Oise department

References

External links

Association of Mayors of the Val d'Oise 

Communes of Val-d'Oise